Ancistria is a genus of beetles in the family Passandridae.

Species
 Ancistria alternans Grouvelle
 Ancistria apicalis Reitter
 Ancistria assamensis Burckhardt & Slipinski
 Ancistria bakeri Kessel
 Ancistria basseti Burckhardt & Slipinski
 Ancistria beccarii Grouvelle
 Ancistria bicolorata Burckhardt & Slipinski
 Ancistria bostrychoides Grouvelle
 Ancistria bouchardi Grouvelle
 Ancistria brancuccii Burckhardt & Slipinski
 Ancistria concava Burckhardt & Slipinski
 Ancistria cornuta Burckhardt & Slipinski
 Ancistria costata Burckhardt & Slipinski
 Ancistria emarginata Grouvelle
 Ancistria fabricii Reitter
 Ancistria foraminifrons Burckhardt & Slipinski
 Ancistria grouvellei Burckhardt & Slipinski
 Ancistria indica Burckhardt & Slipinski
 Ancistria kurosawai Sasaji
 Ancistria lewisi Reitter
 Ancistria longicapitata Burckhardt & Slipinski
 Ancistria micros Grouvelle
 Ancistria nepalensis Burckhardt & Slipinski
 Ancistria nicolettae Burckhardt & Slipinski
 Ancistria papuana Burckhardt & Slipinski
 Ancistria pilosa Burckhardt & Slipinski
 Ancistria reitteri Lewis
 Ancistria retusa Fabricius
 Ancistria stricta Grouvelle
 Ancistria strigosa Grouvelle
 Ancistria tarsalis Waterhouse
 Ancistria tenera Gunther
 Ancistria tenuis Grouvelle

References

Passandridae